Armella Ruben Shakaryan (born 10 May 1972) is an  philologist and politician from Armenia who serves as the Armenian ambassador to the United States of Mexico. On 24 August 2021, Shakaryan, by the decree of then-President Armen Sarkissian, was also appointed as the Ambassador Extraordinary and Plenipotentiary in Costa Rica, Panama, Nicaragua, Guatemala, El Salvador, and Belize from Armenia.

Early life and academic career
Shakaryan was born in the capital of Armenia, Yerevan, 10 May 1972. Between 1990 and 1996 she studied Romance and Germanic Philology at Yerevan State University from where she obtained a bachelor's degree.

Career and family
She has been the Consul General of Republic of Armenia in Los Angeles from 2004 to 2006. She has three children.

References

External links 
 

1972 births
Living people
Armenian philologists
Politicians from Yerevan
Yerevan State University alumni
21st-century Armenian women politicians
21st-century Armenian politicians
Civil Contract (Armenia) politicians
Ambassadors of Armenia to Mexico
Women ambassadors
Ambassadors to Costa Rica
Ambassadors to Panama
Ambassadors to Nicaragua
Ambassadors to Guatemala
Ambassadors to Belize
Ambassadors to El Salvador
Consuls